Sanford House may refer to:

in the United States (by state then city)
Sanford House (Sioux City, Iowa), listed on the NRHP in Woodbury County
Sanford House (Syracuse, New York), listed on the NRHP in Onondaga County
Sanford House (Queensbury, New York), listed on the NRHP in Warren County
White–Turner–Sanford House, Huntsville, Alabama, listed on the National Register of Historic Places (NRHP)
Frederick S. Sanford House, Bridgewater, Connecticut, listed on the NRHP in Litchfield County, Connecticut
Sanford–Curtis–Thurber House, Newtown, Connecticut, listed on the NRHP in Fairfield County
Sanford-Humphreys House, Seymour, Connecticut, listed on the NRHP in New Haven County, Connecticut
George L. Sanford House, Carson City, Nevada, listed on the NRHP
Esbon Sanford House, North Kingstown, Rhode Island, listed on the NRHP in Washington County